Aspergillus implicatus is a species of fungus in the genus Aspergillus. It is from the Sparsi section. The species was first described in 1994. It has been reported to produce a versicolorin derivative.

Growth and morphology

A. implicatus has been cultivated on both Czapek yeast extract agar (CYA) plates and Malt Extract Agar Oxoid® (MEAOX) plates. The growth morphology of the colonies can be seen in the pictures below.

References 

implicatus
Fungi described in 1994